FK Dukla may refer to:
 FK Dukla Prague, a Czech football team
 FK Dukla Banská Bystrica, a Slovak football team